The Tuzla Handicap is an American Thoroughbred horse race for older fillies and mares run at the Santa Anita Park in Arcadia, California at the beginning of the year.  A Grade IIIT stakes race for four-year-olds and up, it's set at a distance of 1 mile on the turf course and offers a purse of $100,000.

The Tuzla is named for the French-bred filly Tuzla who, out of 26 starts, won 12 and placed in 6.  Born in 1994, she was a Grade I winner and retired a millionaire.

Winners

 2009 – Foxysox (GB) (6) (Rafael Bejarano)
 2008 - Trick's Pic (Victor Espinoza) 
 2007 - Singalong (5) (Awarded the win after the disqualification of Conveyor's Angel.)
 2006 - Ticker Tape (5) (Kent Desormeaux)
 2005 - Good Student (ARG) (5)
 2004 - Fudge Fatale (4) (Jose Valdivia, Jr.)

References

 Santa Anita Park Official Website

Horse races in California
Graded stakes races in the United States
Turf races in the United States